The  is a river that has both its source and its mouth in the city of Ise, Mie Prefecture, Japan.  It flows through the heart of Ise.  In 1980, it was designated the most polluted river in Mie, however it no longer holds this status due to cleanup efforts by the city of Ise.

Course
Mie Prefecture
Ise

External links
 (confluence with Isuzu River)

Rivers of Mie Prefecture
Rivers of Japan